AgfaPhoto GmbH is a European photographic company, formed in 2004, when Agfa-Gevaert sold their Consumer Imaging division. Agfa (the former parent company, which merged with film manufacturer Gevaert in 1964) had for many years been well known as a producer of consumer-oriented photographic products including films, photographic papers and cameras. However, within a year of the sell-off, AgfaPhoto had filed for bankruptcy.

The various product brands are now being licensed to various companies by the holding firm AgfaPhoto Holding GmbH.  Minilab service and chemicals are e.g. now sold by A&O Imaging Solutions, and AgfaPhoto Vista Brand Film is sold by Lupus Imaging & Media.

Management buyout
In 2004, Agfa-Gevaert announced that it had reached a definitive agreement to divest the whole of its Consumer Imaging business in a management buyout for a purchase price of €175.5 million. The divestment covered the whole of its Consumer Imaging business, including film, finishing products, and lab equipment, grouped in a new company – AgfaPhoto GmbH, as well as the related lease portfolio, in a management buyout. The targeted closing date of the transaction was November 1, 2004.

The transaction resulted in a non-cash book loss to Agfa-Gevaert of €430 million, but was cash positive to the extent of €260 million. While the trading environment for both HealthCare and Graphic System divisions improved considerably, the group's half year results were heavily affected by the expected book loss on the divestiture of Consumer Imaging.

AgfaPhoto Holding GmbH
The AgfaPhoto Holding GmbH, headquartered in Leverkusen and Cologne/Germany, is dealing internationally in the consumer imaging sector. Based on a long-term trademark agreement with Agfa-Gevaert NV & Co. KG and Agfa-Gevaert NV, the company is granting sublicenses for the AgfaPhoto-trademark and the Red-Dot-Logo.

The following consumer imaging products are offered already with the AgfaPhoto trademark:
Digital Cameras & Camcorder, Analog Filmrolls & (Single Use-) Cameras, Flash Memory Cards & USB Drives, Mobile Energy Products, Digital Photo Frames, Minilabs incl. Service & Spare Parts, Optical & Magnetic Storage Media, LCD TV, DVD Players, Pocket Projectors, Binoculars, Cleaning Products, Ink Cartridges, Photo Paper

The official claim of the brand: "AgfaPhoto is the personal companion that lets consumers experience the world of images in all its exciting facets and turns the special moments in life into lasting and shareable memories."

See also
List of photographic films
List of Agfa films with specifications
Agfa-Gevaert
Agfa digital cameras

References

External links
 Official site
 AgfaPhoto Batteries

Chemical companies of Germany
Defunct photography companies of Germany
Agfa